The 2018 Michigan Wolverines men's soccer team is the college's 19th season of playing organized men's college soccer. It is the Wolverines' 19th season playing in the Big Ten Conference.

Background 
Michigan finished 1st in the Big Ten Conference regular season in 2017 with a 12–6–2 overall record and a 6–1–1 in-conference record. Michigan won in the quarterfinal of the Big Ten Tournament against Northwestern but lost in the semifinal to eventual champion Wisconsin. The team earned a spot in the NCAA tournament as a seeded team, and received a bye to the second round. However, the team lost to Colgate 2–3.

Roster

Competitions

Preseason

Regular season

Big Ten Tournament

NCAA Tournament

Statistics

Transfers

See also 
2018 Big Ten Conference men's soccer season
2018 Big Ten Conference Men's Soccer Tournament
2018 NCAA Division I men's soccer season
2018 NCAA Division I Men's Soccer Championship

References 

Michigan Wolverines
Michigan Wolverines men's soccer seasons
Michigan Wolverines, Soccer
Michigan Wolverines
Michigan Wolverines